Hajjiabad (also Romanized as Ḩājjīābād) is a village in Fal Rural District, Galleh Dar District, Mohr County, Fars Province, Iran. At the 2006 census, its population was 590, in 120 families.

References 

Populated places in Mohr County